Niéméné is a town in northeast Ivory Coast. It is a sub-prefecture of Dabakala Department in Hambol Region, Vallée du Bandama District.

Niéméné was a commune until March 2012, when it became one of 1126 communes nationwide that were abolished.

In 2014, the population of the sub-prefecture of Niéméné was 15,698 15,698.

Villages
The 17 villages of the sub-prefecture of Niéméné and their population in 2014 are:

Notes

Sub-prefectures of Hambol
Former communes of Ivory Coast